Lulu (also called Lula) is a populated place in Oregon County, in the U.S. state of Missouri. The community is on the Mark Twain National Forest boundary along county road 160-129 approximately one mile north of U.S. Route 160 and five miles east of Alton.

History
A post office called Lula was established in 1908, and remained in operation until 1915. The community was named after Lula Stairs, the wife of a local judge.

References

Unincorporated communities in Oregon County, Missouri
Unincorporated communities in Missouri